Edwin Shaar may refer to:

 Edwin W. Shaar (born 1915), American writer, graphic artist and typeface designer